Prehistory is the time before recorded human history.

Prehistory or Prehistoric may also refer to:

Prehistory (album), Circle X album
Prehistoric (TV series), program broadcast on the Discovery Channel

See also